Salford Acoustics offers Acoustics and Audio Engineering Courses, undertakes public and industrial research in acoustics, carries out commercial testing, and undertakes activities to engage the public in acoustic science and engineering. It is based in two locations: (i) 3 km west of Manchester city centre, UK, in the Newton Building on the Peel Park Campus of the University of Salford, and (ii) on the banks of the Manchester Ship Canal at MediaCityUK.

History and current structure 

The first acoustic laboratories were established in Salford in 1965; in the early 1970s the Department of Applied Acoustics was formed. In 1996 the University merged with University College Salford and a Department of Acoustic and Audio Engineering was formed. A couple of years later, this joined with another department to form Acoustic and Electronic Engineering. Finally, when the University greatly reduced the number of schools in the organisation, Salford Acoustics joined the School of Computing, Science and Engineering. Research work comes under the auspices of the Acoustics Research Centre.

Programmes 

The Department of Applied Acoustics first taught an undergraduate degree in 1975, namely the BSc (Hons) in Electroacoustics. This was later renamed Beng (Hons) Acoustics. In 1993, Salford Acoustics set up the BEng (Hons) in Audio Technology. These two undergraduate degrees are now taught under a single banner, BEng Audio Acoustics, with two pathways to represent the different interests of the cohort. Salford acoustics has also taught masters in acoustic engineering and audio for many decades, currently offering an MSc in Audio Acoustics and an MSc in Environmental Acoustics. The Acoustics Research Centre offers masters and doctoral research degrees.

Research

Rating 

The Acoustics Research Centre achieved the top research rating of 6* in RAE 2001 as part of the Research Institute for the Built and Human Environment's submission to Unit Of Assment 30, Architecture and the Built Environment. In 2008, the RAE submission including the Acoustics Research Centre finished top of Research Fortnight’s ‘Research Power’ table for Architecture & the Built Environment. 90% of the research was graded at international standard and 25% at world-leading.

Sub-disciplines 

Research is carried out in the following sub-disciplines of acoustic engineering and science
 Archaeoacoustics
 Architectural and building acoustics
 Audio signal processing
 Auralization
 Electroacoustics
 Environmental noise
 Noise control
 Outdoor sound propagation
 Psychoacoustics
 Remote sensing using sound
 Sound reproduction
 Soundscapes
 Surround sound systems
 Vibration and dynamics

Public engagement 

Examples of public engagement work include:
 The search for the Worst Sound in the World (EPSRC GrantRef:EP/D000068/1)
 Development of extensive curriculum materials on physics and acoustics for schools (EPSRC GrantRefs:GR/S23919/01, EP/D507030/1, P/D054729/1, EP/E033806/1, EP/G020116/1)
 Aeolus sculpture and outreach (EPSRC GrantRefs:EP/G062781/1)
 The search for the Sonic Wonders of the World

Laboratories 

Most of Salford's Acoustics and Audio Laboratories are based on the Peel Park campus, but some are at MediaCityUK: 
 Audio production suites
 Radio studios
 Recording studios
 Anechoic chamber
 2x Semi-anechoic chambers
 Reverberation chamber
 Transmission suite
 Listening room

Commercial work 

Salford Acoustics is a calibration and test house for construction, government, military, audio R&D and the motor industry.

Current Staff

Awards

Notable staff 

 Trevor Cox, (Professor of Acoustic Engineering and Broadcaster)
 Professor Yiu Wai Lam, ex-Editor in Chief of Applied Acoustics
 Olga Umnova

Alumni and Former Staff 

The following past members of Salford Acoustics have been President of the Institute of Acoustics:

 Teli Chinelis, Acoustician and Expert Witness with Finch Consulting Ltd,
 Theo Hutchcraft, Hurts 
 Dr Guy Nicholson, Applications Manager at Apple
 Tom Wrigglesworth, stand-up comedian
 Nick Zacharov, co-author of Perceptual Audio Evaluation
 Velma Allen, Director, Technical Publications at Citrix Systems
 Mark Bailey, Director of Sales, EMEA, at QSC Audio Products, LLC 
 Asa Beattie, Senior Engineer at Technicolor
 Tony Churnside, Creative Technologist at BBC, Technical. Director at The Radiophonic Workshop
 Kelvin Griffiths, Company Director at Electroacoustic Design Ltd
 Ian Bromilow, Principal at Vanguardia Consulting
 Rachel Canham, Partner, WBM Consultants in Noise & Vibration
 Chris Chittock, Managing Director at Dragonfly Acoustics Ltd
 Richard Collman, Managing Director at Acoustical Control Engineers Ltd
 Matt Desborough, Director, Content Services (EMEA) at Dolby Laboratories

 Chris Dilworth, Director (Acoustics) at AWN Consulting
 Matthew Dore, Senior Manager, Sound and Acoustics at Philips Consumer Lifestyle
 Ian Etchells, Principal Consultant at Red Acoustics Limited
 Matthew Hyden, Principal Consultant at Temple Group
 Daniel Goodhand, Owner of Goodhand Acoustics
 Dr Tony Jones, managing director AIRO
 Sam Liston, Director at F1 Sound Company Limited
 Paul Malpas, Director at Engineered Acoustic Design Ltd
 Andrew Marchant, Principal Engineer at HiWave Technologies plc
 Richard Metcalfe, Global Product Line Management at Harman Consumer Group International
 Rick Methold, Director at Southdowns Environmental - Consultants in Acoustics, Noise and Vibration
 Robert Miller, Director at F1 Acoustics Company Limited
 Derek Nash, Managing Director at Acoustics Central
 Chris Needham, Senior Software Engineer at BBC Research and Development
 Rohan Ramadorai, Principal at Atkins Limited

 Andrew Parkin, Acoustics Partner at Cundall
 Richard Perkins, Technical Director - Acoustics at PB
 Martin Raisborough, Technical Director at WSP Group
 Russell Richardson, Director at RBA Acoustics
 Darren Rose, Senior R&D Specialist, Electronics at Genelec Oy
 Mark Scaife, Head of Acoustics - Middle East at WSP Group
 Richard Sherwood, Director at Sound Reduction Systems Ltd
 Simon Shilton, Director, Acustica Ltd
 Vicky Stewart, Principal Acoustician at Atkins
 Martin Stone, Senior Software Engineer at the BBC
 Phil Stollery, Global Product Marketing Manager at Brüel & Kjær, 
 Tim Stubbs, Managing Director at PCB Piezotronics
 Ryan Swales, Director at RS Acoustic Engineering Ltd
 James Trow, Associate Director at AMEC Environment and Infrastructure UK Ltd
 Susan Witterick, Director at dBx Acoustics Limited

See also 

University of Salford

References

External links 

Acoustics
Audio engineering schools
University of Salford
Articles containing video clips